Frexit (a portmanteau of "French" or "France" and "exit") is the hypothetical French withdrawal from the European Union (EU). The term is similar to Brexit, which denotes the UK leaving the EU. The term was mostly used during the campaign leading to the French presidential election of 2017. 

A poll by the Pew Research Center in June 2016, before the 2016 United Kingdom European Union membership referendum, found France to have a 61% unfavourable view of the EU, second only to Greece's 71%, with the United Kingdom on 48%. However, when asked about an actual departure from the EU, 45% of French wanted to stay in the bloc while 33% expressed a desire to leave. The figure in favour of remaining increased to 60% in a subsequent poll in 2019.

The United Kingdom European Union membership referendum held on 23 June 2016, which resulted in 51.9% of votes being cast in favour of exiting the EU, occurred during the electoral campaign leading to the French presidential election of 2017. Following the referendum result, Front National Leader Marine Le Pen promised a French referendum on EU membership if she were to win the presidential election. Former President François Hollande met with politicians including Le Pen in the aftermath of the vote and rejected her proposal for a referendum. Fellow 2017 candidate Nicolas Dupont-Aignan of Debout la France also advocated for a referendum. François Asselineau's Popular Republican Union instead advocate a unilateral withdrawal of the EU using article 50 of the Treaty of Lisbon.

In an early use of the term Frexit, Le Pen said "Just call me Madame Frexit" in a Bloomberg Television interview she gave journalist Caroline Connan on 23 June 2015, one year before the Brexit referendum in June 2016.
In a January 2018 interview with the British Broadcasting Corporation, President of France Emmanuel Macron agreed with Andrew Marr that the French people were equally disenchanted with globalisation and if presented with a simple yes / no response to such a complex question, they would "probably" have voted for Frexit in the same circumstances.

In August 2019, Le Monde editorial director Sylvie Kauffmann argued that "Brexit has made Frexit impossible" and that Le Pen "no longer dared push her Frexit argument" by the time of the 2017 presidential election.

In 2022 French Presidential candidate Éric Zemmour said Frexit would not happen because, "France is not England [sic]. For one thing England has won all its wars for the past two centuries and we have lost all of ours. That means that we don't have as much confidence in ourselves."

Surveys 
In January 2019, pollster Institut français d'opinion publique conducted a survey on several questions that might be asked were the Citizens' initiative referendum to be applied in France. One of these questions is about the exit of France from the EU. The result was that 60% opposed it.

See also 
 Brexit
 
 Withdrawal from the European Union
 Danish withdrawal from the European Union (Danexit)
 Dutch withdrawal from the European Union (Nexit)
 Greek withdrawal from the eurozone (Grexit)
 Hungarian withdrawal from the European Union (Huxit)
 Polish withdrawal from the European Union (Polexit)
 Romanian withdrawal from the European Union (Roexit)

References 

Proposals in France
France and the European Union
Withdrawal from the European Union
Euroscepticism in France
Portmanteaus
Public policy proposals